Cristina Mayville Stenbeck, born 27 September 1977 in New York City, United States, is a Swedish business woman and investor. She is the principal owner and former executive chairman of Investment AB Kinnevik, one of the largest family-controlled companies in Sweden.

Early life
Stenbeck was born in New York City as the eldest daughter of Jan Stenbeck (1942-2002), a Swedish industrialist and entrepreneur, and her American mother, Merrill McLeod. Her parents had three other children, Hugo, Sophie and Max Stenbeck. Her father also had the son Felix Granander. Stenbeck is the granddaughter of Hugo Stenbeck (1890 – 1977), a Swedish industrialist and lawyer who was one of the co-founders of the family company, Investment AB Kinnevik.

Stenbeck attended St. Andrew's School in Delaware (where she later served as a trustee), and graduated from Georgetown University in Washington, D.C. with a Bachelor of Science in 2000 at age 22.

Career
Stenbeck's business career began in 1997 after she joined the board of Invik & Co, a finance-based subsidiary of Kinnevik at the time. Stenbeck assumed leadership of the group in 2003 when she became the vice chairman of Investment AB Kinnevik, later becoming chairman in 2007. In 2016 she stepped down as chairman of Kinnevik to concentrate on her investor role.

For the next decade after 2003, Stenbeck made successful changes at Kinnevik, consolidating the ownership of the group, whilst simplifying the corporate structure. She also divested peripheral businesses in order to reduce leverage and increase transparency of the company.

Her leadership has also seen the group's global network expand; the Kinnevik Group now operate in more than 80 countries in the communication, entertainment, media and e-commerce sectors, with well-known brands like Tigo, Tele2, Viasat, and Zalando forming part of the firm's reach.

In early 2014, she was appointed chairman of the board at the online fashion retail website Zalando. She also joined the board of Spotify.

Honors and awards
In April 2012, Stenbeck was awarded the Swedish Royal Patriotic Society Business Medal for outstanding entrepreneurship, while in November 2012, she won the Golden Gavel for her leadership as chairman of a listed company.

Personal life
Stenbeck has been married to the English businessman Alexander Fitzgibbons since September 2005. She has 5 children. She was named 2016 European Manager of the Year by European Business Press (EBP).

References

21st-century Swedish businesswomen
21st-century Swedish businesspeople
American people of Swedish descent
1977 births
Living people
Stenbeck family
Georgetown College (Georgetown University) alumni
People from Long Island
21st-century American businesswomen
21st-century American businesspeople